Body of Secrets: Anatomy of the Ultra-Secret National Security Agency is a book by James Bamford about the NSA and its operations.  It also covers the history of espionage in the United States from uses of the Fulton surface-to-air recovery system to retrieve personnel on Arctic Ocean drift stations to Operation Northwoods, a declassified US military plan that Bamford describes as a "secret and bloody war of terrorism against their own country in order to trick the American public into supporting an ill-conceived war they intended to launch against Cuba."

For the book, NSA director Michael Hayden gave him unprecedented access. In contrast, his previous book, The Puzzle Palace, was almost blocked from publication by the agency.

Bibliographic data 
 James Bamford, Body of Secrets: Anatomy of the Ultra-Secret National Security Agency, 
 Doubleday; 1st edition (April 24, 2001)  
 Anchor; Reprint edition (April 30, 2002) 
Bamford, James (2002), Body of Secrets: How America's NSA & Britain's GCHQ Eavesdrop On The World (New ed.), London: Arrow,

See also

Notes

External links
 Interview with Bamford on Body of Secrets, Booknotes September 16, 2001

2001 non-fiction books
Books about the National Security Agency
History of the Arctic
Anchor Books books